Cerro Catedral is a mountain located  from San Carlos de Bariloche, and inside the Nahuel Huapí National Park, in Patagonia, Argentina.

It is also popular due to the views of the Nahuel Huapi lake. There are also a number of hotels and hostels at the foot of the mountain, and a summer hikers' hut called Refugio Lynch on one of the tops of the mountain.

During the summer, the Refugio Frey and a camping accommodate trekkers and rock climbers next to Tonček lagoon, near the Torre Principal; Catedral's highest point.

On August 27, 2005, the 1st South American Ski Mountaineering Championship in combination with the last race of the 2005 South American Ski Mountaineering Cup and the 2nd International Open of ski mountaineering was carried out on the Cerro Catedral.

Climate
The climate is affected by the altitude. At higher elevations, at the weather station, the climate is classified as an alpine climate or a tundra climate (Köppen ET) while at lower elevations, the climate is classified as a cool mediterranean climate (Köppen: Csb). Cerro Catedral has the highest frequency of days with snowfalls in Argentina, averaging 98 days per year.

Gallery

Panoramas

See also 

 Cerro Castor
 Chapelco
 Las Leñas
 List of ski areas and resorts in South America

References

External links 
 Catedral Alta Patagonia
 Image of Catedral mountain in winter (1000x644 pixels)
 Panoramic view of higher ski areas in winter (2400x626 pixels)
 Panoramic view from cerro the Catedral sky resort to the Andes in winter (2600x846 pixels)
 Pataclimb.com, an online climbing guidebook to Cerro Catedral
 Ski runs homologated by the FIS for alpine racing

Mountains of Argentina
Landforms of Río Negro Province
Ski areas and resorts in Argentina
Tourist attractions in Río Negro Province
Bariloche
Nahuel Huapi National Park